Terry Rossiter (born 2 July 1944) was a Zimbabwean diver. He competed in two events at the 1964 Summer Olympics.

References

1944 births
Living people
Zimbabwean male divers
Olympic divers of Rhodesia
Divers at the 1964 Summer Olympics
Place of birth missing (living people)